Turan Manafov is an Azerbaijani footballer who plays as a defender for Sabail in the Azerbaijan Premier League.

Club career
On 23 September 2018, Manafov made his debut in the Azerbaijan Premier League for Sumgayit match against Keşla.

References

External links
 
 Turan Manafov at Sabail FC Official Site

1998 births
Living people
Association football defenders
Azerbaijani footballers
Azerbaijan youth international footballers
Azerbaijan under-21 international footballers
Azerbaijan Premier League players
Sumgayit FK players
Sabail FK players
Olympiacos Volos F.C. players
Azerbaijani expatriate footballers
Expatriate footballers in Greece